Strahinja Rašović (born 9 March 1992) is a Serbian water polo player for VK Novi Beograd. He competed in the 2020 Summer Olympics.

Honours

Club
Crvena Zvezda
LEN Champions League: 2012–13
 LEN Super Cup: 2013
 Serbian Championship: 2012–13, 2013–14
 Serbian Cup: 2012–13, 2013–14
 Atlètic-Barceloneta
 Spanish Championship: 2015–16, 2016–17 
 Copa del Rey: 2015–16, 2016–17  
 Copa de Cataluña: 2016–17
 Radnički Kragujevac
Adriatic League: 2020–21
 Serbian Championship: 2020–21
 Novi Beograd
LEN Champions League runners-up: 2021–22
 Adriatic League: 2021–22
 Serbian Championship: 2021–22

Awards
Hungarian Championship Top Scorer: 2019–20 with Egri
Serbian Championship Top Scorer 2021–22 with Novi Beograd
 2022 World Championship Team of the Tournament

References

External links
 

1992 births
Living people
Sportspeople from Belgrade
Water polo players at the 2020 Summer Olympics
Olympic gold medalists for Serbia in water polo
Medalists at the 2020 Summer Olympics
Serbian male water polo players